Kläden is a village and a former municipality in the district of Stendal, in Saxony-Anhalt, Germany. Since 1 January 2010, it is part of the town Bismark, of which it is an Ortschaft. Before that, it was part of the Verwaltungsgemeinschaft Bismark/Kläden.

References

Former municipalities in Saxony-Anhalt
Bismark, Germany